Ardmore Avenue station is (along with Villa Avenue station) one of two former Chicago Aurora and Elgin Railroad (CA&E) stations in Villa Park, Illinois. It was listed on the National Register of Historic Places in 1980 as Ardmore Avenue Train Station.

History
The station is a stone-faced structure built in 1910 by the Ballard & Pottinger real estate firm. The station was erected to draw passengers to property that the firm was developing. The plan was successful, and enough people moved into the station vicinity to prompt incorporation as Villa Park in 1917. The station catered to passengers until July 3, 1957, when the CA&E abruptly shut down after years of financial losses. The Ardmore Avenue station is one of very few of what was once seventy-three railroad stations that served the CA&E. On November 21, 1980, it was listed on the National Register of Historic Places. Today, the station is the headquarters of the Villa Park Chamber of Commerce. The building now lies along the Illinois Prairie Path, a recreational path built along the former CA&E right-of-way.

Architecture
The one story structure is built in an English motif and served mostly as a waiting shelter. Doors and windows are made of wood with steel lintels. The tile roof has galvanized iron gutters and a brick chimney. The building features a wood cornice. The station could be heated by a wood-burning fireplace and had electric lighting. Windows are found on all sides and two doors are on the north, leading to the platform. The interior was originally furnished with wood benches and flip-top seats.

References

External links

Villa Park Chamber of Commerce

National Register of Historic Places in DuPage County, Illinois
Railway stations in the United States opened in 1910
Railway stations closed in 1957
Ardmore Avenue
Former railway stations in Illinois
Railway stations on the National Register of Historic Places in Illinois
Villa Park, Illinois
1910 establishments in Illinois
1957 disestablishments in Illinois
Railway stations in DuPage County, Illinois